Westfälisches Landestheater  (WLT) is a theatre in Castrop-Rauxel, North Rhine-Westphalia, Germany. There are four theaters in Nordrhein-Westfalen: the Westfälische Landestheater, the Landestheater Detmold, the Landestheater Burghofbühne in Dinslaken, and the Rheinische Landestheater in Neuss. 

All of the WLT's premieres happen in the city Castrop-Rauxel. During the 2017/2018 show season, there were over 360 shows and about 85,000 audience members. Each show season, the WLT premieres up to 15 shows. It is located in the Europaplatz in Castrop-Rauxel. 

Theatres in North Rhine-Westphalia